Juričić is a surname. Notable people with the surname include:

Bruno Juričić (born 1977), Croatian architect
Darko Juričić (born 1969), Croatian athlete
Filip Juričić (born 1981), Croatian actor
Ignacio Juricic, Chilean film director
Juraj Juričić (?–1578), Croatian-Slovene Protestant preacher and translator
Luka Juričić (born 1983), Croatian actor
Mato Juričić (Matthew Yuricich), Academy Award-winning special effects artist.
Richard Yuricich (born 1942), Academy Award-nominated special effects artist.
Srećko Juričić (born 1954), Croatian former professional football player

See also
 Jurčić
 Jurić

Croatian surnames